Mad Max is an action-adventure video game based on the Mad Max franchise. Developed by Avalanche Studios and published by Warner Bros. Interactive Entertainment, it was released for PlayStation 4, Windows, and Xbox One in 2015. Feral Interactive published the game's Linux and macOS versions. In the game, players control Max Rockatansky as he progresses through the wasteland building a vehicle, the "Magnum Opus", to do battle with a gang of raiders, led by Scabrous Scrotus, and to reach the storied "Plains of Silence", where he hopes to find peace. Mad Max emphasizes vehicular combat, in which players can use weapon and armor upgrades on their car to fight enemies. It is set in an open post-apocalyptic wasteland consisting of deserts, canyons, and caves.

Two other Mad Max games, developed by Cory Barlog and Interplay Entertainment respectively, were in production before the announcement of this game, but neither of them were successfully released. Although Mad Max is not based on the film series, it was inspired by its universe, and franchise creator George Miller was consulted during the game's pre-production. Avalanche Studios found developing a vehicular-combat video game a challenge because of their inexperience with creating that type of game. Announced at E3 2013, the game was re-tooled during development and the PlayStation 3 and Xbox 360 versions were canceled.

Originally planned for release in 2014, it was released in September the following year, several months after the theatrical release of Mad Max: Fury Road, the fourth film in the series. Mad Max received overall mixed reviews from critics. Although the game's environment, direction, vehicular combat, and graphics were praised, its quest design and story were criticized. The game became the eighth best-selling retail game in the United States in September 2015.

Gameplay

Mad Max is an action-adventure game set in an open world post-apocalyptic environment, emphasizing vehicular combat, in which the player is the eponymous Mad Max. According to its publisher, up to 60 percent of the game focuses on driving. Some weapons and tools, including flamethrowers and turbo boosts, are mounted directly onto the Magnum Opus, while others, such as a harpoon and sniper rifle, are used in conjunction with the vehicle by Chumbucket, Max's assistant, or Max himself. Max's Magnum Opus, with its V8 engine and powerful ramming ability, can destroy enemies' vehicles and weaponry. When simultaneously driving and aiming, the game changes to slow motion to allow the player to toggle between targets. Although Mad Max primarily uses a third-person perspective, the player can switch to first-person view when fighting enemies while driving the Magnum Opus. Chumbucket repairs the car when instructed to do so or when the player exits.

To encourage exploration, the Magnum Opus can be upgraded with materials scavenged from the desert, by hijacking enemies' cars or collecting their car parts. An enemy can jump on top of the Magnum Opus to make it explode, but the player can avoid that by surrounding the car with hazards such as spikes. The player can access the garage screen throughout the game, allowing them to customize the Magnum Opus. Max's garage can change and modify the car's engine, chassis, wheels, body work, paint job, and its "shell". Upgrading one aspect of the car will negatively affect other aspects; upgrading the engine will allow Max to drive faster, but handling will be more difficult. The sound produced by the engine changes when the player changes, adds, or remove parts of the Magnum Opus. Max, his armor, and weapons are customisable; the player can unlock new skills and upgrades for him as he progresses through the game and earns experience points. Max is also customisable, with his clothing, appearance, fighting skills, and weapons being modifiable. Griffa, a wasteland wanderer, also offers Max tokens which can be used to upgrade his abilities.

Although the game has many choices (such as playing stealthily or aggressively), it emphasizes action over stealth. Mad Max features a variety of weapons, including Max's iconic shotgun, but ammunition is scarce and the game emphasizes melee combat over firearms. One weapon is the explosive Thunderstick, which can be lanced into an enemy's chest. The game has a free-flow combat system combining professional wrestling attacks and boxing techniques, similar to Warner Bros.' previous Batman: Arkham video-game series (in which indicators on enemies' heads remind the player when to strike, counter or make finishing moves). Attacks by Max during his "frenzied" state are more powerful than usual.

Mad Maxs landscape consists of canyons, caves, deserts, and abandoned wastelands. The game's world is divided into several regions, with each having its own backstory and landscape. Unique landmarks and ruins can be discovered in each region. Side activities such as races, time trials, invading enemy fortresses, and eliminating enemy convoys can be found in each region. A region's threat level is lowered by completing these activities, facilitating its navigation. Each region has a boss, who can be found and defeated in their base. Some of the game's strongholds are friendly, and eliminating hostile strongholds gives Max additional quests and rewards. These strongholds can be upgraded, offering Max different benefits such as helping Max to collect scraps when the game is turned off, or restoring Max's health and shotgun ammo upon visits. Max can ascend in a hot-air balloon (permanently attached to the ground) to look for new objectives and locations. After seeing the objectives through binoculars, they are highlighted on the map. Max can be guided by Chumbucket in strategically completing his objectives. Max is accompanied by a dog companion who can help players detect land mines. Max has limited climbing abilities, and objects that he can climb are highlighted in yellow.

Most resources in the game are scarce except for gasoline, which is needed for driving. The player can collect one jerrycan at a time, storing it in the back of the Magnum Opus, and can find collectibles (history relics) throughout the game. The relics are primarily photos and notes of the wasteland before the apocalypse. Food and water are vital to Max's survival; the player can collect them in the wasteland and use them to replenish their health. Max can also eat small animals, such as rodents, and maggots from decomposing corpses, to replenish his health, and areas where he can find food and supplies have crows flying around them. As initially described, the player would be able to venture into the Big Nothing, an uncharted, volatile area of the wasteland with dangerous sandstorms and no food or water in which rare parts for the Magnum Opus could be found (according to Avalanche, the "Big Nothing" made the game map infinite) but ultimately this was not a feature of the final gameplay. A dynamic day-night cycle, a weather system and a variety of environmental hazards are included in the game, whose terrain is affected by weather and natural disasters.

Plot 
In search of fuel, highway patrol officer-turned-survivalist Max Rockatansky (Bren Foster) journeys to the Plains of Silence. He runs into the War Boys led by Scabrous Scrotus (Travis Willingham), son of Immortan Joe (Fred Tatasciore) and ruler of Gastown. The War Boys run Max off the road and steal his car and supplies, leaving him to die in the desert. Max chases them and challenges Scrotus to a duel on the Land Mover. Scrotus sics his war hound on Max, but after Max fends off the dog, Scrotus throws it off the Land Mover in disgust. Max then stabs Scrotus in the head with his own chainsaw, but Scrotus kicks Max off the Land Mover.

Befriending the abandoned dog, Max obtains a weapon and clothes from a dead Wastelander. In the desert, Max finds a hunchbacked mechanic named Chumbucket (Jason Spisak) who calls him the Saint. Chumbucket leads Max to Scrotus and the War Boys and tells him that he is building a car, the Magnum Opus, but it lacks critical parts; Max agrees to search for them. Max must first liberate Wasteland leaders' territories from the War Boys: Jeet (Josh Keaton), whose stronghold is in an old lighthouse, and Gut Gash (Liam O'Brien), whose followers believe that they will be protected from a flood in their ship stronghold built on the remains of an oil tanker. He must penetrate a massive gate protected by War Boys, using the Magnum Opus outfitted with an exploding harpoon. Max and Chumbucket must then save Pink Eye (Adrienne Barbeau), a woman whose mechanical skill rivals Chumbucket's, from an invasion of her silo base led by Stank Gum—one of Scrotus' Top Dogs.

Searching for a V8 engine for the Magnum Opus, Max learns about a race in Gastown with a Big Chief V8 as a prize. After winning the race against Stank Gum (Yuri Lowenthal) and defeating the fighter Tenderloin in a Thunderdome duel, Max receives the engine and the concubine Hope (Courtenay Taylor). His victory is short-lived; Scrotus recognizes Max and attacks him. After he is shot with a crossbow and thrown down a mine shaft, Max is saved by Hope, who takes him to the Organic Mechanic and Scab (Orion Acaba)—also known as the Bloodbag. While Max is undergoing surgery, he has a hallucination that his wedding to Hope is officiated by Chumbucket and a man with a dog's head. When he wakes up, he and Hope steal the Big Chief; they drive to the temple of Deep Friah (Robin Atkin Downes), a friendly fire cultist.

At the temple, Hope asks Max to find her daughter, Glory (Madison Carlon), who had fled to Buzzard territory. He travels to the Underdune and rescues Glory from the Buzzards. Returning, he discovers that Chumbucket took the Magnum Opus to his old home. Max follows him in one of Deep Friah's cars, but learns that Scrotus and Stank Gum tortured Chumbucket, who revealed Hope and Glory's location and their ties to Max. Max kills Stank Gum, rushes back to the temple and finds Hope hanged to death and Glory tortured on the floor. Glory dies in his arms, and Max swears vengeance against Scrotus.

He returns to Gastown and learns Scrotus' location from Scab. Max and Chumbucket find Scrotus driving around the Purgatory Flatlands, and use the Magnum Opus to crash the Land Mover, which is pushed to the edge of a cliff. Max wants to push the Mover off the cliff with the Magnum Opus but is opposed by Chumbucket, who considers himself the car's protector. Ignoring Chumbucket, he rams the Mover at full speed; Chumbucket dies, and the Land Mover and Magnum Opus are destroyed. Scrotus escapes with the Interceptor, Max's car at the start of the game, and challenges him. Max wins the battle, pulling the chainsaw blade out of Scrotus' head and killing him. Max enters the Interceptor and places a picture of his family on the dashboard as he heads off.

Development

A video game set in the Mad Max universe was mentioned by franchise creator George Miller in a 2008 interview. Miller joined God of War II director Cory Barlog to develop the game after Barlog left Sony Computer Entertainment. The project was originally intended as a tie-in with a Mad Max animated film which would be released simultaneously. The film's production was suspended to allow adequate production time for the game. After Barlog announced in 2008 that a publisher for the game was being sought, no further information about the project was forthcoming. In 2010, Barlog was a consultant for Avalanche Studios, leaving in 2012 for Crystal Dynamics. A Fury Road tie-in video game was in development by Interplay Entertainment, but was scrapped when Electronic Arts acquired the franchise's video-game rights for $20 million.

On 14 February 2013, a blurry screenshot of the game was released by Avalanche Studios founder and CEO Christofer Sundberg. The game was announced at Electronic Entertainment Expo 2013 on 10 June at Sony's press conference, with a scheduled 2014 release for PlayStation 3, PlayStation 4, Windows, Xbox 360, and Xbox One. Although Sundberg said during the expo that Miller and Barlog's project was not the Mad Max game announced by Avalanche, he later said that Barlog had worked on a Mad Max game at Avalanche. Despite the unclear relationship between the projects, according to the game's design director, Miller had collaborated with Avalanche during the game's pre-production in mid-2011. Despite having Miller to offer input, Warner Bros. was inclined to give much creative freedom to Avalanche. Full production of the game began before May 2012.

In April 2014, Avalanche announced that Mad Max would be delayed until the following year, making it one of the titles released during Avalanche's "biggest year since [its] inception". The game was retooled during development. Despite its release that year, the game is not directly connected to 2015's Mad Max: Fury Road and was not intended to be a tie-in; its setting and story are original. This decision was made because the game's publisher, Warner Bros. Interactive Entertainment, believed that a standalone game was more beneficial to players than a "play-the-movie game" after the success of its Batman: Arkham series. Locations which have appeared in the films, such as Gas Town and Thunderdome, are featured in the game. Unlike previous Avalanche games, such as Just Cause 2, the game's tone is more mature and its narrative is emphasized.

Similar to the films, Max seldom speaks or expresses emotion; his thoughts are reflected by his actions. The team aimed at developing a complex character and personality for him. According to the game's director, Max is traumatized by past experiences (such as losing his family); this makes him "insane", "unstable", and "mad". These qualities are reflected in the game's "rage" mode, in which Max inflicts additional damage on enemies. Chumbucket, Max's mechanic and companion, is obsessed with the Magnum Opus; according to the game's lead writer, he "has a pseudo-religious/sexual relationship with engines". Scabrous Scrotus, the game's main antagonist, is a warlord designed as a "bloodthirsty monster that only can find solace from his own pain through the suffering of others". Enemies' faces are painted and scarred; according to game director Frank Rooke, their appearance "is kind of the approach of how this civilization merged into this kind of state".

Lead designer Emil Krafting said that gameplay was the top priority during development. Like the Just Cause series, Mad Maxs developer aimed to give players autonomy by providing tools to create their own events. The studios intended to build a dynamic world, creating "a seamless series of events". The game was inspired by the atmosphere of the Mad Max universe, rather than a particular film in the series. According to Avalanche, they did not plan to be influenced by other post-apocalyptic video games such as Fallout, Rage, and Borderlands since most of those games were inspired by the original Mad Max. The company said that the game's vehicular combat posed a challenge because of their inexperience with that type of game. The car customization system was designed to increase the game's fun factor and give players more freedom.

The game's world was inspired by the Just Cause series, which features large sandboxes for players to explore. Avalanche Studios CEO Christofer Sundberg hoped that players would compare Mad Maxs desert setting to the western setting of Red Dead Redemption. The game world is scaled according to gameplay density and frequency; the development team emphasized creating a world with choices and distractions, rather than focusing on size. Designed as dead, threatening, and hostile, it is also exciting and engaging (encouraging exploration). One challenge faced by the developers was building a wasteland with a variety of environments, since Mad Max is Avalanche's first post-apocalyptic game. They spent most of their time designing ground and terrain variations to minimize repetition in the landscape. Since the game is set in a desert, the team used vibrant colors for the sky. Avalanche Studios sent a team to a Costa Rican jungle to inspect local landscapes and environments in preparation for creating the world of Mad Max, particularly its sky. Like the films, the game does not identify the apocalypse; its developers wanted to give "a sense of mystery" to the wasteland so players could imagine how the wasteland evolved. Garages allowing players to upgrade and repair their cars were originally intended to be featured in the game. The idea was later scrapped, since the studio thought the element "interfered with gameplay".

Mad Max is powered by Apex Engine (formerly known as Avalanche Engine), an in-house proprietary engine developed by Avalanche and also used in Just Cause 2. According to lead graphics designer Alvar Jansson, new graphical features were introduced to the engine during the development of Mad Max and it was designed and optimized for open-world games. The team also worked on improving the world's draw distance and ensuring that gameplay across the three major platforms have no significant difference.

Gaming journalists invited to preview a private gameplay demonstration at E3 2013 noted that Max had an American accent, rather than the Australian accent of the film series, and fans protested his new American voice; Avalanche Studios later confirmed that he would have an Australian accent. Donal Gibson, the brother of the original Mad Max star Mel Gibson, expressed interest in taking the lead role in the video game adaptation. However, Australian actor Bren Foster, who previously starred in The Last Ship and Days of Our Lives, was chosen for the role. The game's setting is described as "wasteland creole", with elements of a number of civilizations, so its characters have a variety of accents.

Release

Mad Max was released on 1 September 2015 in North America and the United Kingdom, 2 September in Australia, 3 September in New Zealand and 4 September in Europe for PlayStation 4, Windows, and Xbox One. It was announced on 3 May 2015 that the PlayStation 3 and Xbox 360 versions had been cancelled due to hardware restrictions, but a Linux port was announced. The game was released for Linux and macOS on 20 October 2016.

Players who pre-ordered the game could receive the Ripper, an additional Magnum Opus design. The Ripper, a steelbook, collector's box, mini-license plate and Blu-ray copy of Mad Max: Fury Road were included in the Post-Apocalypse Edition. PlayStation 4-version purchasers could access a Road Warrior Survival Kit, with twelve hood ornaments for the Magnum Opus, exclusively until 30 November 2015. To promote Mad Max, Warner Bros. Interactive Entertainment sponsored launch events. In Australia, the company invited artists to create artwork on their vehicles with dust. They joined Uber for a Seattle promotion in which Uber users could access a free ride "straight from the post-apocalypse". The offer was free, since "dollars are worthless in the wasteland".

Reception

Critical reception

Mad Max received "mixed or average" reviews from critics, according to review aggregator Metacritic.

Its story received a mixed response. Brandin Tyrrel of IGN found the story surprising and genuine, despite most of the action occurring later in the game. Tyrrel wrote that the characters have different personalities and distinct qualities, and considered them the "true star" of the game. According to Chris Carter of Destructoid, the game's story engages the player. Leon Hurley of GamesRadar found the overall story weak and "barely exist[ing] for the majority of the game", but thought the game's climax was exciting. Matt Bertz of Game Informer also criticized the story, calling it thin and light, and called the voice actors' performances uneven.

Mad Maxs world design received generally positive reviews. According to Brandin Tyrrel, it captured the films' savage tone and the game's sandbox was a "gorgeous" setting for players to explore. GamesRadar's Leon Hurley praised the game's scale, which he compared to The Witcher 3: Wild Hunt. Martin Robinson of Eurogamer compared its scale favorably to Avalanche's previous Just Cause game series, and opined that Avalanche had successfully combined the Mad Max universe with an open-world game design. Matt Bertz praised the game's inhospitable atmosphere, commending Avalanche for adding a variety of styles and a vibrant sky to an otherwise-boring sandbox. Daniel Bloodworth of GameTrailers echoed Bertz, calling each region unique and distinct. Bloodworth also praised Avalanche for its efforts in crafting the world. Peter Brown of GameSpot praised Mad Maxs natural disasters, writing that it set a new standard for in-game weather effects. Philip Kollar of Polygon criticized the game's layout, writing that every location in the game feels identical and its bland environments discourage exploration.

Tyrrel considered the vehicular combat one of the game's best elements, adding a layer of creativity. Brown praised the car action, calling it intense, complex, and unpredictable, but criticized the over-simplistic and shallow on-foot combat. Carter compared the game's vehicular controls to the best racing games, and commended its handling. He also praised the car mechanics, writing that it has offered players a cinematic experience. Tyrrel liked the additions to the game's combat (such as the introduction of weapons and the Fury mode), writing that they added depth to the combat. Hurley praised the game's progression system, which he found satisfying, and the balance between vehicular and on-foot combat. Bloodworth wrote that the melee combat used a "tried-and-true system" which worked well, despite awkward camera angles. Kollar criticized the boss fights, which he thought lacked variety.

Other gameplay aspects received mixed reviews. Tyrrel praised the customization system for Max and the Magnum Opus, since the customization impacts the gameplay and makes the overall experience more rewarding; Kollar echoed this. Brown criticized the game for failing to offer much challenge or a sense of accomplishment to players. He called the health system a redundant addition in which resources, such as water and food, play an insignificant role and can be neglected by players. Brown also criticized the scrap-collecting system, writing that it frustrated most players and slowed the game's pace. However, Robinson wrote that those elements reflect the barbarian nature of the wasteland. He praised its world design (which he thought echoed the films), describing it as "a world of twisted metal and sudden violence that's there to be survived rather than conquered". Bloodworth criticized the game's stronghold system, which he called repetitive. Brown criticized the game's lack of a climbing system, which hinders movement; this was echoed by Carter.

Mad Maxs quest design also received mixed reviews. Tyrrel praised the content and activities scattered across the world, calling the activities engaging for most players. However, he disliked the repetition which dragged down their replay value. Hurley found it easy for players to become confused in the game's early stages, since the objectives are unclear. Brown criticized the structure of several quests which force players to use a certain method, removing freedom and creativity. Chris Carter of Destructoid wrote that the game brought nothing new to the genre, and its quests and features were too similar to typical Ubisoft open-world design.

The game had some technical problems when it was released. Tyrrel noted an unstable frame rate and occasional texture pop-up, and Kollar identified audio problems.

Sales
Mad Max was the second-best selling game in the United Kingdom in its first week of release on the United Kingdom software retail chart, only behind Metal Gear Solid V: The Phantom Pain, which was released the same day. According to the NPD Group, it was the eighth-best selling game in the United States in September 2015.

Notes

References

External links

2015 video games
Avalanche Studios games
Cancelled PlayStation 3 games
Cancelled Xbox 360 games
Linux games
MacOS games
Mad Max
Open-world video games
PlayStation 4 games
Post-apocalyptic video games
Single-player video games
Vehicular combat games
Video games about death games
Video games about police officers
Video games based on films
Video games developed in Sweden
Video games using Havok
Video games set in Australia
Warner Bros. video games
Windows games
Xbox One games
Feral Interactive games